Acral keratoderma may refer to:
 mal de Meleda
 Striate palmoplantar keratoderma

Palmoplantar keratodermas